"Man on Mars" is a song by English indie rock band Kaiser Chiefs, taken from their fourth studio album The Future Is Medieval (2011). It is the first Kaiser Chiefs single to feature drummer Nick Hodgson on lead vocals.

Music video
A music video to accompany the release of "Man On Mars" was first released onto YouTube on 16 August 2011 at a total length of four minutes. The video consists entirely of footage of Kaiser Chiefs' trip to Japan, including footage of fans singing karaoke and some brief clips of their performance at Fuji Rock Festival 2011.

Track listing

Chart performance

References 

2011 singles
Kaiser Chiefs songs
Song recordings produced by Tony Visconti
Songs written by Nick Hodgson
Songs written by Ricky Wilson (British musician)
Songs written by Simon Rix
Songs written by Andrew White (musician)
Songs written by Nick "Peanut" Baines
2011 songs
Polydor Records singles